There are at least thirteen current and three former special routes of U.S. Route 27.

Williston–Perry alternate route

U.S. Route 27 Alternate (US 27 Alt.) is a  alternate route of US 27 that exists in the north-central part of the U.S. state of Florida. It is signed north–south, but is a primarily east–west route, traveling between Williston and Perry. US 27 Alt. is concurrent with US 19/US 98 from Chiefland to Perry, and also has the hidden FDOT designation of State Road 55 (SR 55). Between Williston and Chiefland, it has the hidden SR 500 designation.

US 27 Alt. is one of the primary routes between Northwest and Central Florida, having been recently four-laned along its entire length.

Attapulgus business loop

U.S. Route 27 Business (US 27 Bus.) is a  business route of US 27 that partially exists in the city limits of Attapulgus, Georgia. It is concurrent with State Route 1 Business (SR 1 Bus.) for its entire length. US 27 Bus./SR 1 Bus. begin at an intersection with US 27/SR 1 east-southeast of Attapulgus. It travels to the west-southwest and curves to the northwest. At the city limits of Attapulgus, it curves to a due-west direction. It travels just south of Lillian E. Williams Elementary School and then intersects the northern terminus of SR 241 (South Main Street). It curves to a nearly due-north direction before leaving the city. It travels through rural areas of the county before a curve to the northeast. It meets its northern terminus, a second intersection with US 27/SR 1 (Tallahassee Highway), which is also the southern terminus of Hodges–Riley Road. The entire length of US 27 Bus./SR 1 Bus. is part of the National Highway System, a system of routes determined to be the most important for the nation's economy, mobility, and defense.

The roadway that would eventually become US 27 Bus./SR 1 Bus. was established at least as early as 1919 as part of SR 1. In the first half of 1936, this segment had a "completed hard surface". Between the beginning of 1953 and the 1960, SR 1 was routed on a more direct path between Amsterdam and Attapulgus, with a "soil surface". In 1989, an eastern bypass of Attapulgus, designated as SR 831, was proposed from east-southeast of the city to north-northwest of it. In 1995, US 27/SR 1 was shifted onto this bypass. Its former path was redesignated as SR 1 Bus. Between the beginning of 1996 and the beginning of 2011, US 27 Bus. was designated on the path of SR 1 Bus.

Bainbridge business loop

U.S. Route 27 Business (US 27 Bus.) is a  business route of US 27 that exists completely within the city limits of Bainbridge, Georgia. It is concurrent with State Route 1 Business (SR 1 Bus.) for its entire length. It begins at an interchange with US 27/US 84/SR 1/SR 38, which is a freeway-grade bypass of downtown Bainbridge. US 27 Bus./SR 1 Bus. travels to the north-northwest on Tallahassee Highway. The name changes to Scott Street at an intersection with College Street. At Shotwell Street, they begin a concurrency with US 84 Bus./SR 38 Bus. The four highways head on a due-west direction. At South Broad Street, US 27 Bus./SR 1 Bus. ends its concurrency with US 84 Bus./SR 38 Bus. and begins one with SR 97/SR 309. They pass Willis Park and then split at Calhoun Street, with SR 97/SR 309 heading east and US 27 Bus./SR 1 Bus. heading west. They curve to the west-northwest and cross over the Flint River. After this crossing, the local name changes to Dothan Road. At Newton Road, they begin a brief concurrency with SR 253; at Spring Creek Road, SR 253 splits off. They then reach their northern terminus, another interchange with the US 27/US 84/SR 1/SR 38 bypass. Here, US 84/SR 38 takes on the Dothan Road name; US 27/SR 1 uses the Colquitt Highway name. The roadway that would eventually become US 27 Bus./SR 1 Bus. was established at least as early as 1919 as part of SR 1. By the end of 1934, US 27 was designated on SR 1 in the area. By the end of 1939, this segment of US 27/SR 1 had a "completed hard surface". Between the beginning of 1960 and the beginning of 1965, US 27 (and possibly SR 1) in the Bainbridge area was shifted onto the bypass, at the time designated as SR 38 Loop. The former path of US 27 was redesignated US 27 Bus. By the beginning of 1977, SR 1 Bus. was indicated to be designated on US 27 Bus. in the city. In 1976, SR 38 Loop was decommissioned, with the SR 38 mainline designated on its former path. The former path of SR 38 was redesignated as SR 38 Bus.

Blakely business loop

U.S. Route 27 Business (US 27 Bus.) is a  business route of US 27 that exists completely within the city limits of Blakely, Georgia. It travels concurrent with State Route 1 Business (SR 1 Bus.) for its entire length. US 27 Bus./SR 1 Bus. begins at an intersection with US 27/SR 1 in the southeastern part of the city. They travel northwest on South Main Street and curve to a nearly due-north direction just before an intersection with SR 39 (East South Boulevard). US 27 Bus./SR 1 Bus./SR 39 continue to the north. Just to the east of Early County High School and Early County Middle School, SR 62 (Columbia Street) joins the concurrency. This intersection also marks the western terminus of Bob White Avenue. Two blocks later, the concurrency begins to travel around the town square. On the east side of this square, SR 62 departs the concurrency. The concurrent highways continue northward, crossing over some railroad tracks of Norfolk Southern Railway, and intersect SR 62 Byp. (Martin Luther King Jr. Boulevard). At this intersection, SR 39 departs the concurrency. US 27 Bus./SR 1 Bus. begins curving to the northwest and head to the east-southeast just before reaching their northern terminus, a second intersection with US 27/SR 1. Between the beginning of 1920 and the end of 1921, the Colquitt–Cuthbert, which formerly traveled through Arlington and Edison, was shifted westward to travel through Blakely. By the end of 1934, US 27 was designated on all of SR 1. By the end of 1939, all of US 27/SR 1 in the Blakely area had a "completed hard surface". In 1992, an eastern bypass of Blakely, designated as SR 838, was proposed from south-southeast of the city to north-northeast of it. The next year, US 27/SR 1 in the Blakely area was shifted eastward, onto the path of SR 838. The former path through the city became US 27 Bus./SR 1 Bus.

Cuthbert business loop

U.S. Route 27 Business (US 27 Bus.) is a  business route of US 27 that partially exists in the city limits of Cuthbert, Georgia. It is concurrent with State Route 1 Business (SR 1 Bus.) for its entire length. US 27 Bus./SR 1 Bus. starts at an intersection with US 27/SR 1 south of Cuthbert. They travel on Blakely Street to the northwest and curve to the north-northeast. Just south of the city limits, they intersect the northern terminus of Edison Highway, which leads to SR 216. They cross over some railroad tracks of Norfolk Southern Railway. In downtown, they intersect US 82/SR 50 at the town square (which functions like a traffic circle around a memorial park). The four highways have a brief concurrency around the town square. After departing the town square, US 27/SR 1 curves to the north-northwest before resuming its north-northeast direction. After crossing over Town Branch, US 27 Bus./SR 1 Bus. leaves the city limits. It curves to the northeast and reaches its northern terminus, a second intersection with US 27/SR 1. The roadway that would eventually become US 27 Bus./SR 1 Bus. was established at least as early as 1919 as part of SR 1 from Edison, through Cuthbert, and into Lumpkin. By the end of 1921, the Colquitt–Cuthbert segment was shifted westward to travel through Blakely. By the end of 1934, US 27 was designated on the entire length of SR 1. In 1938, the northern two-thirds of the Randolph County portion of the Blakely–Cuthbert segment had a "completed hard surface". In the third quarter of 1939, the southern part of the Randolph County portion of the Cuthbert–Lumpkin segment also had a completed hard surface. In 1993, a southeastern bypass of Cuthbert, designated as SR 847, was proposed from south-southwest of the city to north-northeast of it. The next year, the path of US 27/SR 1 through the Cuthbert area was shifted eastward, onto SR 847. The former path was redesignated as US 27 Bus./SR 1 Bus.

Lumpkin connector route

State Route 1 Connector (SR 1 Conn.) is a  connecting route of SR 1 that exists almost entirely within the city limits of Lumpkin, Georgia. It begins at an intersection with SR 27 (Broad Street) in the west-central part of the city. It travels nearly due north on Chestnut Street for one block to an intersection with the eastern terminus of SR 39 Conn. (Florence Street). It curves to the north-northeast and crosses over some railroad tracks of CSX before leaving the city. Almost immediately, it curves to the northwest and reaches its northern terminus, an intersection with US 27/SR 1. In 2001, SR 1 Conn. was established on its current path.

Bremen business loop

U.S. Route 27 Business (US 27 Bus) is a  business route of US 27 that exists almost entirely within the city limits of Bremen. It is concurrent with State Route 1 Business (SR 1 Bus.) for its entire length. US 27 Bus./SR 1 begins at an intersection with US 27/SR 1 in the southern part of the city, just north of Interstate 20 (I-20), in the north-central part of Carroll County. The business routes head to the northeast, enter Haralson County, and briefly leave the city limits. Just after re-entering, they travel under a railroad bridge that carries railroad tracks of Norfolk Southern Railway. They curve to the north-northwest and pass Higgins General Hospital at a point just west of Bremen High School. They intersect US 78/SR 8 (Atlantic Avenue/Pacific Avenue). Immediately on the north side of the intersection are railroad tracks for Southern Railway and Norfolk Southern Railway. They continue to the north-northwest and leave the city again before reaching their northern terminus, a second intersection with US 27/SR 1 north-northwest of the city. The entire length of US 27 Bus./SR 1 Bus. is part of the National Highway System, a system of routes determined to be the most important for the nation's economy, mobility, and defense.

The roadway that would eventually become US 27 Bus./SR 1 Bus. was established at least as early as 1919 as part of SR 1. By the end of 1934, US 27 was designated on the entire length of SR 1. In the second quarter of 1935, a portion in the northern part of Bremen had a "completed hard surface". Between September 1938 and July 1939, a portion in the southern part of the city also had a completed hard surface. About 50 years later, in 1988, a western bypass of Bremen, designated as SR 793, was proposed from south-southwest of the city to north-northwest of it. In 1993, US 27/SR 1 in the Bremen area was shifted westward, onto the path of SR 793. The former path was redesignated as US 27 Bus./SR 1 Bus.

Buchanan business loop

U.S. Route 27 Business (US 27 Bus.) is a  business route of US 27 that partially exists in the city limits of Buchanan, Georgia. It is concurrent with State Route 1 Business (SR 1 Bus.) for its entire length. US 27 Bus./SR 1 Bus. begins at an intersection with US 27/SR 1 southeast of Buchanan. Here, the roadway continues as Hilltop Drive. The business routes travel to the northwest, paralleling some railroad tracks of the Norfolk Southern Railway. They enter Buchanan and curve to the north-northwest. After intersecting SR 120, it travels on a bridge over the railroad tracks, which switch to the west side of the business routes. They travel just to the west of Buchanan Primary School and Buchanan Elementary School and just to the east of the Buchanan City Cemetery. They leave Buchanan and curve to the north-northeast before reaching their northern terminus, a second intersection with US 27/SR 1 north of the city. The entire length of US 27 Bus./SR 1 Bus. is part of the National Highway System, a system of routes determined to be the most important for the nation's economy, mobility, and defense.

The roadway that would eventually become US 27/SR 1 was established at least as early as 1919 as part of SR 1. Between April and October 1934, a portion in the southern part of Buchanan had a "completed hard surface". By the end of the year, US 27 was designated on SR 1. In the third quarter of 1939, a portion in the northern part of the city had a completed hard surface. About 50 years later, in 1989, SR 811 was proposed from US 27/SR 1 south-southeast of Buchanan north-northwest across US 27/SR 1, and curved around the east side of the city to a point north-northwest of it. In 1992, US 27/SR 1 was rerouted onto the proposed path of SR 811 and was shifted east of the city. The former path was redesignated as US 27 Bus./SR 1 Bus.

Cedartown business loop

U.S. Route 27 Business (US 27 Bus.) is a  business route of US 27 that exists entirely within the city limits of Cedartown, Georgia. It is concurrent with State Route 1 Business (SR 1 Bus.) for its entire length. US 27 Bus./SR 1 Bus. begins at an intersection with US 27/SR 1/SR 100 (Martha Berry Highway) in the southern part of the city. This intersection is just north of the Cedar Valley Country Club. The business routes travel to the southeast and curve to the northwest. They travel on an overpass over US 27/SR 1/SR 100 and curve to the north-northwest and briefly parallel some railroad tracks of Norfolk Southern Railway. They intersect US 278/SR 6/SR 100 (Canal Street/Martin Luther King Jr. Boulevard). They pass the Cedartown Welcome Center and cross over some railroad tracks of CSX. In downtown Cedartown, they pass Polk County Court House No. 2. They curve to the north-northeast and travel just to the west of Greenwood Cemetery. Then, they travel to the east of Peek Forest Park and Springdale Lake. They curve to the northeast and reach their northern terminus, a second intersection with US 27/SR 1 (Martha Berry Highway). Here, the roadway continues as Davis Road. The entire length of US 27 Bus./SR 1 Bus. is part of the National Highway System, a system of routes determined to be the most important for the nation's economy, mobility, and defense.

The roadway that would eventually become US 27 Bus./SR 1 Bus. was established at least as early as 1919 as part of SR 1. By the end of 1934, US 27 was designated on the entire length of SR 1. In the first half of 1936, a portion of US 27/SR 1 in the southern half of the city had a "completed hard surface". Between September 1938 and July 1939, the portion in the northern part of the city also had a completed hard surface. In 1987, an eastern bypass of Cedartown, designated as SR 744, was proposed from south-southwest of the city to north-northeast of it. In 1991, US 27/SR 1 in the Cedartown area was shifted eastward, onto the path of SR 744, with US 278/SR 6, which was also shifted out of the main part of the city. The former path of US 27/SR 1 was redesignated as US 27 Bus./SR 1 Bus.

Columbus–Carrollton alternate

U.S. Route 27 Alternate (US 27 Alt.) is an alternate route of US 27 from Columbus to Carrollton in the U.S. state of Georgia. While the main line of US 27 travels through LaGrange, US 27 Alt. veers to the east to serve the towns of Warm Springs, Greenville, and Newnan.

Rome loop route

State Route 1 Loop (SR 1 Loop) is an  loop route of SR 1 that exists in the east-central part of Floyd County, Georgia, almost entirely within the city limits of Rome. It begins at an intersection with US 411/SR 20 in the extreme southeastern corner of Rome. Here, the roadway continues as Mathis Road. It travels to the north-northeast and crosses over the Etowah River. SR 1 Loop curves to the north-northwest, leaves the city limits, and intersects SR 293 (Kingston Road). It curves to the northwest and travels on a bridge over some railroad tracks of Norfolk Southern Railway before re-entering the city limits of Rome. Almost immediately is an intersection with SR 53 (New Calhoun Highway). It curves to the west-southwest and passes State Mutual Stadium, the home stadium of the Minor League Baseball team Rome Braves. The loop crosses over the Oostanaula River before intersecting US 27/SR 1 on the southeastern corner of Berry College. On the southwestern corner, it crosses over Little Dry Creek. The highway curves to the northwest and travels to the north of Redmond Regional Medical Center. It travels to the west and curves to the south. It crosses over some railroad tracks of Norfolk Southern Railway. SR 1 Loop curves to the southwest and crosses over more railroad tracks of Norfolk Southern Railway before reaching its northern terminus, a second intersection with SR 20. Here, the roadway continues as Coosawattee Avenue. The entire current length of SR 1 Loop (and the entire length of the unbuilt portion in between the two sections) is part of the National Highway System, a system of routes determined to be the most important for the nation's economy, mobility, and defense.

In 1985, SR 53 Spur was built from US 27/SR 1 just south of Mount Berry to SR 53 northeast of Rome; it was proposed to be extended west-northwest and south-southwest to SR 20 west-northwest of Rome. SR 746 was proposed from US 411/SR 20 southeast of Rome north-northeast and northwest to tie into the path of SR 53 Spur at an intersection with SR 53. The next year, the portion west of US 27/SR 1 was cancelled. In 1990, SR 746 was built from US 411/SR 20 to SR 293 east-northeast of Rome. In 1992, all of SR 53 Spur and SR 746's completed section were redesignated as SR 1 Loop, with the segment between SR 293 and SR 53 between them completed, as well. The next year, SR 1 Loop was completed from SR 20 west-northwest of Rome to US 27/SR 1 in Mount Berry.

LaFayette business loop

U.S. Route 27 Business (US 27 Bus.) is a  business route of US 27 that exists entirely within the city limits of LaFayette, Georgia. It is concurrent with State Route 1 Business (SR 1 Bus. for its entire length. US 27 Bus./SR 1 Bus. begins at an intersection with US 27/SR 1 in the southeastern part of the city. They travel to the west-northwest and curve to the northwest. The business routes cross over Town Creek and curve to the north-northeast. They begin a concurrency with SR 193 (West Main Street). Just over  later, SR 193 splits off onto East Villanow Street. This intersection is southwest of LaFayette Cemetery. They pass the Joe Stock Memorial Park and travel west of LaFayette Middle School before reaching their northern terminus, an intersection with US 27/SR 1/SR 136 (Lyle Jones Parkway/North Main Street) in the northern part of the city. The entire length of US 27 Bus./SR 1 Bus. is part of the National Highway System, a system of routes determined to be the most important for the nation's economy, mobility, and defense.

The roadway that would eventually become US 27 Bus./SR 1 Bus. was established at least as early as 1919 as part of SR 1 in the LaFayette area. Between October 1929 and June 1930, a portion in the southern part of LaFayette had a "completed hard surface". By the end of 1930, US 41W was designated on SR 1 from Rome to LaFayette. By the beginning of 1932, a portion of US 41W/SR 1 in the northern part of the city had a completed hard surface. By the end of 1934, US 41W was decommissioned, and US 27 was designated on the entire length of SR 1. Nearly 50 years later, an eastern bypass of LaFayette, designated as SR 730, was proposed from southeast of the city to north-northeast of it. In 1988, US 27/SR 1 in the area was shifted eastward, onto the path of SR 730. Its former path through the city was redesignated as US 27 Bus./SR 1 Bus.

Nicholasville business route

U.S. Route 27 Business (US 27 Bus.) is a  business route of US 27 that exists in Nicholasville. It travels through the heart of downtown, while the main route of US 27 travels just west of town.

Cynthiana business loop

US 27 Business (US 27 Business) in Cynthiana runs through the heart of downtown, while the main route of US 27 runs on a bypass alignment just west of town.

Cynthiana connector

U.S. Route 27 Connector (US 27 Conn) is a connector route in Cynthiana, Kentucky. It connects US 27 with Kentucky Route 36.

Former routes
In addition to the routes below, Michigan had a set of special routes of US 27 that have mostly been renumbered as special routes of different parents. The business route in Charlotte is now numbered as a business route of I-69. Those in Lansing, St. Johns, Ithaca, Alma, St. Louis, Mount Pleasant, Clare, and Harrison have been renumbered as business routes of US 127. Additionally, there was a US 27A that became the Alma business route and a Truck US 27 that became part of the former mainline US 27 through Lansing. The former business route in Marshall was turned over to local control and never renumbered as another highway.

Lake Weir alternate

U.S. Route 27 Alternate (US 27 Alt.) is an alternate route of US 27 that exists around Lake Weir, from Belleview to Lady Lake, existed until 1980. This was also concurrent with US 441 Alt., and today is a bi-county maintained segment of County Road 25 (CR 25).

Polk County alternate

Another Alternate U.S. 27 existed in Polk County from Haines City to Sunray Deli Estates. This bannered route was deleted in 1998 due to the north end being at U.S 17/92 instead of U.S. 27. Some road maps and atlases still continued to show it until 2011. The road is now known as State Road 17.

Sebring–Avon Park alternate route

A third Alternate U.S. 27 existed from Sebring to Avon Park. It was deleted in 1979, and is also part of State Road 17.

Columbus spur route (1946–1969)

State Route 1 Spur (SR 1 Spur) was a spur route of SR 1 that existed entirely within Muscogee County. Between the end of 1921 and the end of 1926, the roadway that would eventually become SR 1 Spur was established as an unnumbered road, with a "completed hard surface", from the southwestern part of Fort Benning north-northeast to SR 1 southeast of Columbus. In 1934, this road's northern terminus was shifted northwest to just southeast of Columbus. Early the next year, this road was under construction. At the end of the year, it again had a completed hard surface. Between the beginning of 1945 and November 1946, it was designated as SR 1 Spur. By February 1948, it was extended northwest into Columbus, on Cusseta Road, then right onto 10th Avenue, and then left on 8th Street to end at US 27/US 280/SR 1. Between April 1949 and August 1950, its northern terminus was shifted east-northeast, onto Brown Avenue, to end at SR 103 (Buena Vista Road). Between the beginning of 1953 and the beginning of 1964, SR 1 Spur's northern terminus was truncated to its original point, at US 27/US 280/SR 1 north of Fort Benning. Its former path north of US 27/US 280/SR 1 on Fort Benning Road was redesignated as SR 357; its path on Cusseta Road and Brown Avenue was redesignated as SR 103 Spur. In 1969, SR 357 was extended south-southwest, replacing all of SR 1 Spur.

This table shows SR 1 Spur at its greatest extent (1948 to 1949).

Columbus business loop

State Route 1 Business (SR 1 Bus.) was a business route of SR 1 that existed mostly within Columbus, Georgia. The roadway that would eventually become SR 1 Bus. was established at least as early as 1919 as part of SR 1 in the Columbus area Between the end of 1926 and the end of 1929, the entire length of highway in the area had a "completed hard surface". Between the beginning of 1953 and the beginning of 1964, a freeway in the eastern part of Columbus was under construction from US 27/US 280/SR 1 (Victory Drive) southeast of the city to SR 357 (Buena Vista Road). It was projected from there to US 27/SR 1 north-northeast of the city. In 1966, SR 1 was designated on this freeway. Its former path through Columbus was redesignated as SR 1 Bus. In 1975, this freeway was redesignated as part of Interstate 185 (I-185; with the unsigned designation SR 411). SR 1 was reverted onto its former path, replacing SR 1 Bus.

Columbus spur route (1963–1988)

State Route 1 Spur (SR 1 Spur) was a spur route of SR 1 that existed entirely within the city limits of Columbus, Georgia. Between June 1960 and June 1963, it was established on 4th Street from the Alabama state line to US 27/US 280/SR 1 (4th Avenue). Between the beginning of 1953 and the beginning of 1964, US 280 in Columbus was shifted southwestward onto the path of SR 1 Spur. In 1967, US 80's path in Columbus was shifted southeastward, onto the path of US 27/SR 1, then onto US 280/SR 1 Spur. In 1988, SR 55 in the Columbus area and SR 1 Spur were redesignated as part of SR 520. At this time, US 80 was shifted northward, off of this path.

LaGrange spur route

State Route 1 Spur (SR 1 Spur) was a short-lived spur route of SR 1 that existed entirely within the city limits of LaGrange, Georgia. Between June 1963 and the end of 1965, it was established from US 27/SR 1/SR 219 (Hamilton Road) in the south-central part of downtown LaGrange north-northwest to US 29/SR 14/SR 109 (Broad Street) in the western part. In 1971, SR 1 in the city was shifted westward, replacing the spur route.

Floyd County spur route

State Route 1 Spur (SR 1 Spur) was a short-lived spur route of SR 1 that existed in the south-central part of Floyd County, Georgia. The roadway that would eventually become SR 1 Spur was established at least as early as 1919 as part of SR 1. By the end of 1934, U.S. Route 27 (US 27) was designated on the entire length of SR 1. At the end of 1937, a portion south-southwest of Rome had a "completed hard surface". The next year, the entire Floyd County portion of US 27/SR 1 had a completed hard surface. Between the beginning of 1945 and November 1946, SR 1's path south-southwest of Rome was shifted eastward. Its former path on US 27 was redesignated as SR 1 Spur. Between June 1954 and June 1955, SR 1 was reverted onto its old path, replacing SR 1 Spur. Its former path, east of US 27 was redesignated as SR 1E.

Rome spur route

State Route 1 Spur (SR 1 Spur) was a spur route of SR 1 Spur that existed entirely within the city limits of Rome, Georgia. Between July 1957 and June 1960, it was established on East 12th Street from US 27/US 411/SR 1/SR 53 (Cave Spring Road) east-southeast to SR 101 (Dean Avenue). By June 1963, US 411 in the east part of the city was routed onto SR 101 at the eastern terminus of SR 1 Spur. In 1966, it was redesignated as SR 53 Spur.

References

27
 
27
27
27